David Vaněček (born 9 March 1991) is a Czech professional football player who currently plays for Sigma Olomouc. He has represented his country at Under-16, Under-18 and Under-19 level.

Career

He spent time on loan at six clubs over a three-year period between 2010 and 2013. Vaněček signed a permanent contract with Hradec Králové in February 2014, tying him to the club until the end of the 2015–16 season. He is the cousin of another David Vaněček; they played together at Sokolov.

Vaněček joined Scottish Premiership side Heart of Midlothian in January 2019, having signed a pre-contract agreement in July 2018. In his second appearance for the club he was described as "rubbish" by manager Craig Levein, and substituted after 34 minutes. Levein later said that Vaněček had apologised to him for his lack of fitness. Vanacek was released the following summer having left Hearts by mutual consent, and two days later signed to Hungarian Nemzeti Bajnokság I team Puskás Akadémia.

References

External links
 
 

1991 births
Living people
People from Planá
Czech footballers
Association football forwards
Czech Republic youth international footballers
Czech First League players
FC Viktoria Plzeň players
FC Silon Táborsko players
FK Ústí nad Labem players
FC Sellier & Bellot Vlašim players
FK Baník Sokolov players
FC Vysočina Jihlava players
FC Hradec Králové players
FK Teplice players
Heart of Midlothian F.C. players
Czech expatriate footballers
Expatriate footballers in Scotland
Czech expatriate sportspeople in Scotland
Scottish Professional Football League players
Puskás Akadémia FC players
Diósgyőri VTK players
Czech expatriate sportspeople in Hungary
Expatriate footballers in Hungary
Nemzeti Bajnokság I players
SK Sigma Olomouc players
Czech National Football League players
Sportspeople from the Plzeň Region